A top-four primary or top-four ranked-choice voting is an election method using a nonpartisan blanket primary where up to four candidates, those with the most votes, advance from a first round of voting, regardless of the political party. The round two (general) election, held some weeks later, uses instant-runoff voting (IRV, also known as ranked-choice voting, RCV) to confirm a majority winner among the top set of candidates.

Its first use was in 2022 Alaska's at-large congressional district special election. It can be seen as a replacement to the blanket primary which advances only the top-two candidates. It was first advocated by FairVote in 2012 with a statutory model proposed in 2015.

A top-four primary can be seen as a variation of a two-round system where the second round (general election) is always held, even if a candidate gains a majority in the first (primary) round. A candidate receiving 20% of the primary vote is logically guaranteed to pass a top-four primary.

One variation, called Final Five Voting (FFV), allows five candidates to pass the open primary.

Usage

Top-four

Alaska

The 2020 Alaska Measure 2 initiative in Alaska for top-four primary narrowly passed with 50.55% of the vote. It will be used for all state and federal elections except for the president. The Alaskan Independence Party sued, declaring Ballot Measure 2 as unconstitutional. On January 19, 2022, the Alaska Supreme Court ruled that the measure was constitutional.

The blanket primary is held using first past the post, with voters allowed one vote, and the four candidates with the most votes advancing to the general. The general election ballot allows candidates to be ranked, using Instant-runoff voting elimination to identify a majority winner. The first top-four primary election occurred on August 16, 2022.

For Alaska's 2022 at-large congressional district special election, 48 candidates registered, while only 9 candidates were invited to a first panel discussion: 5 Republicans, 2 Democrats and 2 independents based on various criteria. Despite 48 candidates, the Special election June primary resulted in the top-4 candidates gaining 68.8% of the vote: Sarah Palin 27.01%, Nick Begich, III 19.12%, Al Gross 12.63%, Mary Peltola 10.08%, with the 5th candidate Tara Sweeney at 5.92%. Al Gross withdrew after the primary, and suggested 5th place Sweeney be included in the final ballot, but this was not allowed.  In the general election, Republican votes were split between Palin and Peltola, causing Begich to be eliminated first (despite being preferred over both other candidates). Votes were then transferred to both Palin and Peltola, resulting in Peltola winning.

Missouri

The Better Elections campaign of Missouri collected 300,000 signature for a Top-Four Ranked-Choice Voting for local, state, and Federal Officials, needing 160,199 valid signatures. The initiative would have been voted on in November 2022.  However, the signatures needed to be distributed among six congressional districts to qualify, and the campaign did not collect enough in Missouri's 1st District, so the initiative was rejected. The ballot initiative will be attempted again.

Top-five
Petitions sponsored by Katherine M. Gehl and Institute for Political Innovation.

Nevada
Nevada Voters First has a petition for a Top-Five Ranked-Choice Voting Initiative, if enough signatures will appear on the ballot on November 8, 2022. At least 135,561 valid signatures are required by June 21, 2022 for the initiative to make the ballot, with, the group backing the voting overhaul,announcing it has gathered more than 266,000 signatures.

The initiative would amend the Nevada Constitution to establish open top-five primaries and instant-runoff voting for general elections. It would allow the 35% of voters who are not registered to a party to influence the candidates who advance to the general election. The change would apply to congressional, gubernatorial, state executive offices, and state legislative elections. Supportive legislation would be required for adopted by July 1, 2025.

Benefits 
 More choices for voters while protecting majority rule
A traditional top-two blanket primary often reduces the field too far, eliminating strong candidates who otherwise deserve attention in the debates and general election.
 Not too many choices
Limiting the general election to four candidates helps focus attention to a small set of candidates. In round two (general election) voters only need to rank 3 choices to be able to express a preference between the final two candidates in identifying a majority winner.

In contrast, some municipal elections use instant-runoff voting (IRV) with a single round of voting, remove the primary to save money and give voters more choice in the higher turnout general election however this risks a general election with dozens of candidates, making it harder for voters to know which candidates can win, and which candidates need to be ranked to express a vote among the final two.

 All voters help decide who advances
Replacing a closed partisan primary with a blanket primary can help protect a moderate strong incumbent from being knocked out in a closed party primary by a more extreme candidate within that party. An incumbent only needs to make top-four to advance.

Any challenger to an incumbent, even within the same party, can advance if they also are able to make the top-four.

Vote splitting 

With a pick-one, top-four primary, advancing top-four candidates maintains a threat of vote splitting, same as a pick-one nonpartisan blanket primary top-two primary, just a little more generous with 4 candidates remaining. There may be multiple candidates eliminated below fourth place, while some could have advanced if fewer candidates had run and split their vote.

For illustration, a party with 48% could theoretically win all top-four if their four candidates each earned 12%, while a stronger 52% majority party might equally split their votes at 10.4% each and lose all five candidates. Vote-splitting will be experienced as threatening to parties who may lose all their candidates, compared to a closed primary where one candidate from each party always advances.

Likewise, the use of sequential-elimination ranked IRV in the primary also suffers from vote-splitting.  Candidates are eliminated based only on first-choice votes, which become split between similar candidates vying for them. The transfer of votes between candidates mitigates this effect somewhat (when two candidates have identical appeal to voters and their votes wholly transfer to each other) but does not eliminate it in the general case, as advocates claim.  To avoid vote-splitting in the RCV general election, parties must still try to discourage too many candidates running under their label, and party voters need to be informed which candidates are most likely to advance to avoid wasting their vote.

An argument in favor of a pick-one top-four primary is that people's first rank choices are most important and the eventual winner of the election will most likely be among the top-four first-rank choices. A pick-one top-four primary can be considered a single non-transferable vote (SNTV) system.

An argument in favor of using IRV sequential-elimination in the primary is that more voters help pick the top-four, and marginally more will be happy with supporting at least one in the general election.

Variations
The uniting feature of all variations is to reduce the field of candidates in a primary round, and confirming a majority winner in the general election. Ranked ballots enables a majority winner among more than two candidates.

Final Five Voting
Final Five Voting (FFV) is a variation proposed by Katherine Gehl, American businesswoman president/CEO of her family-owned company, Gehl Foods. In 2020 she created a not-for-profit Institute for Political Innovation to foster cross-partisan cooperation in election and political reform. FFV uses a pick-one primary, with the top-five candidates advancing to an IRV general election for a majority winner. Allowing five candidates to advance could, for example, allow two strong Democrats, two strong Republicans and one independent to advance, allowing intra-party and inter-party differences of opinion to be debated.
Final Five Voting also retains a risk of vote splitting in both the pick-one primary and the RCV general election.

Primary 

 Pick-One, Top-Four Advance
 The simplest voting top-four primary uses pick-one, allowing only one choice to be expressed, and the top-four candidates advance, first proposed by FairVote in 2012 for giving twice as many choices as a traditional top-two primary. The eventual winner of any runoff system will likely be in this top-four set, but in a primary of many candidates, there will be vote-splitting and like-minded voters are not allowed the chance to consolidate behind a strongest choice.
 A lower threshold may be included to eliminate candidates below it. This may allow fewer than four candidates to advance and focus attention on the strongest candidates in the general election.
 Use IRV Sequential-Elimination for Top-Four
Using ranked ballots and IRV in the open primary is not necessary, but it minimizes the risks of vote splitting where a party might lose all their candidates. A IRV sequential-elimination process will maximize the number of voters helping to pick the top set of candidates who advance.
With sequential-elimination, a party (or any group) with 20% of the vote, with members ranking only within their party, they will be guaranteed to advance at least one strongest candidate.

 Minimum Thresholds in Top-Four
Minimum thresholds may be required to pass the primary. There are two types of threshold - a lower floor threshold on the first count with first-rank support, and a higher consolidation threshold with elimination of lower candidates. Thresholds are often used in exhaustive ballot runoffs if candidates don't voluntarily withdraw. In a top-four process, there is an implicit threshold of 20% above which a candidate is logically guaranteed to make the top-four.
A 5% floor threshold may be required for first choice viability, and a 10% consolidation threshold with transfer votes from a sequential-elimination. Including thresholds may result in fewer than four candidates advancing, rewarding stronger candidates with more attention. 
For example, if four candidates remaining have A=48%, B=45%, C=5%, and D=2% of the vote, it can be argued it is better to also eliminate C and D, allowing voter attention to focus on the strongest two candidates.
 Lower-end thresholds, like a 1% floor threshold and 5% consolidation threshold can still be useful over no thresholds as a vetting process.
Threshold passed helps vet candidates as serious and deserving of journalistic attention, debate/forum inclusion, and general election ballot access. These significant weaker candidates may be unable to win, but they can help change the quality of campaign issues that are addressed. Stronger candidates have an incentive to pick sides on the issues of weaker candidates to earn lower rank support from their voters.

Post-primary
 Voluntary Drop-out Between Primary and General
If a party advances two (or more) candidates among the top-four, candidates may desire to drop out and endorse another, helping a party focus resources and earn more positive attention on that one strongest choice. To aid this process, election rules may include a final date for candidates to drop-out and be voluntarily excluded from the general election ballot. That final date would ideally be after a public debate/forum, along with feedback from public polls.

General 
 Sequential-Elimination IRV in General election
 An instant-runoff voting general election eliminates one candidate at a time, allowing ballots for eliminated candidates to move to their next viable choice. This process continues until one candidate consolidates a 50%+1 of the vote.
 Top-two Advancement or Batch-style Elimination IRV in General election
A top-two IRV advancement may be preferable for major parties or candidates, allowing the top-two candidates to advance to compete head-to-head in a final count. A top-two IRV or batch-style IRV elimination was used in 3 states in 1912: Florida, Indiana, and Minnesota (called preferential voting, replaced by party primaries by the 1930s).
 Top-two IRV makes no difference among three candidates, but among four, a top-two may cause vote-splitting between third and fourth place: they could both be eliminated without a chance to consolidate. This risk of vote splitting can encourage one of two like-minded candidates to drop-out, if both are polling below top-two.
Top-two IRV is consistent with majority rule among four candidates. The top-two candidates control the largest pair-combined majority of the vote. Candidates who believe they can win don't want to risk falling from second place to third and lose their chance to compete head-to-head against their strongest rival.
 For example, a tough top-four election case might look like: A=40%, B=25.01%, C=24.99%, D=10%. A sequential-elimination IRV would eliminate D and allow their transfer votes to decide which of B or C advances, while the top-two IRV process would let A and B compete head-to-head for a winner. The system has no knowledge which of A, B, or C can win a final majority, so it can be argued most fair to reward the voters of B with the chance to compete head-to-head against A for having more top-choice support. This potential vote splitting can be considered to punish D voters, those who support C next, for not compromising immediately to a stronger choice. However supporters for C and D both retain a chance to help identify the majority preference between A and B via their lower ranked choices.
 Condorcet Methods or Round Robin Voting in General election
 Edward B. Foley, American lawyer, law professor, election law scholar, promotes a Round-robin voting process (Like Round-robin tournaments) in a top-four general election. This identifies a head-to-head Condorcet winner, using ranked ballots to determine all 6 permutations pairwise majority preferences among 4 candidates (A versus B, A v. C, A v. D, B v. C, B v. D, C v. D). If one candidate can beat the other 3 pairwise, they win as the strongest majority candidate. 
 Condorcet elections differ from runoff elections in that all lower preferences are considered, and how you vote in lower preferences can affect whether a higher choices win or lose. This fact may encourage tactics like bullet voting for a favorite or burying strongest rivals. (In contrast IRV meets a Later-no-harm criterion which promises to never let lower choices harm higher ones, because they are ignored unless all higher ones are eliminated, but which does not make it safe to rank a favorite first.)
 This can cause surprising results. Theoretically a choice whom is no one's first choice can win, for being everyone's second choice.  (IRV, in contrast, can eliminate a candidate even when the electorate preferred them over all others.)
 It is also possible there will be no Condorcet winner, like the Rock, Paper, Scissors game where each beats one, and loses to one. These circular ties are rare, but in such cases, special rules must be decided to break the "cycle" to pick a winner. 
 For example, the Black method uses the Borda count instead if there is a cycle (named after Duncan Black). Better special rules ideally would attempt to minimize the benefits of insincere tactical voting.

Summary 
All of these variations, including a traditional nonpartisan blanket primary, allow a majority to confirm the winner. 
A top-four primary allows twice as many choices in the general election as a top-two. 
A sequential-elimination IRV process in the primary is important because the primary is best designed to help like-minded voters consolidate to their strongest collective choice.
Including a floor threshold (like 5%) with batch-elimination and consolidation threshold (like 10%) with sequential-elimination in the primary will help advance only the strongest candidates, which may be less than four.
A top-two IRV process in the general election may be preferred because the consolidation process is complete and voters for the top-two first-rank candidates will feel they have earned the right to compete head-to-head.
A Round Robin Voting or Condorcet process in the general election may be preferred because it more deeply reflects voters will by using all ranked preferences, rather than just top ones.

References

External links
 

Alaska elections
Electoral systems
Primary elections
Elections in the United States